Nicolas Mahut was the defending champion, but he lost to Stéphane Robert in the quarterfinal.
Xavier Malisse defeated Stéphane Robert 6–1, 6–2 in the final.

Seeds

Draw

Finals

Top half

Bottom half

References
 Main Draw
 Qualifying Draw

Singles